Drew Pearson (born January 12, 1951) is an American former professional football player who was a wide receiver in the National Football League (NFL) for the Dallas Cowboys. He played college football for the Tulsa Golden Hurricane. He was elected for induction into the Pro Football Hall of Fame in 2021.

Early years
Pearson was born and raised in South River, New Jersey, and began his football career at South River High School as one of the wide receivers of Joe Theismann. As a junior, he succeeded Theismann as the starting quarterback. He also lettered in baseball and basketball, graduating in 1969.

He accepted a football scholarship from the University of Tulsa. As a sophomore in 1970, he was the backup quarterback behind John Dobbs. He started four games, making 36 out of 86 completions (41.9%), for 423 passing yards, one touchdown and 5 interceptions.

As a junior in 1971, he was converted into a wide receiver. He was second on the team with 22 receptions for 429 yards. He led the team with an average of 19.5 yards per reception and 3 receiving touchdowns.

As a senior in 1972, he led a run-oriented offense with 33 receptions for 690 yards (20.9 yards per reception) and 5 touchdowns. He finished his college career with 55 receptions for 1,119 yards, 8 touchdowns and a 20.3-yard average per reception.

In 1985, he was inducted into the Tulsa Athletics Hall of Fame. In 1998, he received the NCAA Silver Anniversary Award.

Professional career

In 1973, he was signed as an undrafted free agent by the Dallas Cowboys and made the team as a third-team wide receiver because of his special teams play. As a rookie, he replaced Otto Stowe after Stowe suffered a broken ankle in the seventh game of the season against the Philadelphia Eagles, and his backup Mike Montgomery would also fall to injury in the next game. He appeared in 14 games with 6 starts, making 22 receptions for 388 yards and 2 touchdowns.

In 1974, Stowe asked to be traded and Pearson became the full-time starter opposite Golden Richards. He led the team with 62 receptions and 1,087 yards, while also catching 2 touchdowns. He would keep leading the team in receiving until 1978, when Tony Hill took over the number one role at wide receiver.

In 1979, he and Tony Hill—along with Tony Dorsett—helped the Cowboys become the first team in NFL history to have two 1,000-yards wide receivers and a 1,000-yard running back, when he recorded 55 receptions, 1,026 yards and 8 touchdowns. Pearson and Hill also became the first wide receiver tandem in Cowboys history to record 1,000-yard receiving seasons in the same year.

In 1980, he surpassed Bob Hayes' club mark in receptions and was selected by the Cowboys as their nominee for NFL Man of the Year. In the 1981 NFC Championship Game against the San Francisco 49ers, Pearson almost rendered "The Catch" irrelevant when, in the waning moments of the game, he caught a long pass from Danny White that would've gone for a touchdown and won the game for the Cowboys had 49ers cornerback Eric Wright not made a one-handed horse-collar tackle, stopping him just outside field-goal range (White fumbled on the next play, thus preserving victory for the 49ers and putting them in Super Bowl XVI).

In 1983, he passed Hayes as the franchise leader in receiving yards.

In March 1984, Pearson fell asleep while driving his Dodge Daytona, causing a crash against a parked tractor-trailer. Pearson sustained a career-ending liver injury in the accident, and his brother Carey was killed in the crash.

Pearson helped the Cowboys to three Super Bowl appearances and a victory in Super Bowl XII in 1978. He also scored a touchdown in Super Bowl X. Pearson was known as "Mr. Clutch" for his numerous clutch catches in game-winning situations, especially the Hail Mary reception from Roger Staubach that sealed the victory over the Vikings in a 1975 playoff game, one of the most infamous plays in NFL history. He also caught the game-sealing touchdown in a 1973 playoff game against the Los Angeles Rams and the game-winning touchdown pass from reserve quarterback Clint Longley in the 1974 Thanksgiving game against the Washington Redskins. All three plays were named among the Top 75 plays in NFL history by NFL Films in 1994. Pearson figured prominently in a fourth play on that list, throwing the final block to clear Tony Dorsett's path to the end zone on his 99-yard touchdown run in 1983. In addition in the 1980 playoff game at Atlanta, Pearson's clutch receptions helped win that game in a comeback by the Cowboys.

He rose to become one of the NFL's greatest wide receivers, earning career records of 489 receptions and 7,822 receiving yards, along with 189 rushing yards, 155 yards returning kickoffs, and 50 touchdowns (48 receiving and two fumble recoveries). Pearson was named one of the Top 20 Pro Football All-Time wide receivers, he was also recognized for his achievements by being named to the NFL 1970s All-Decade Team. Despite this fact, he was the only player from the team to not be inducted into the Pro Football Hall of Fame at the time, including the only one from the offensive first team category.

Pearson was named All-Pro three times (1974, 1976–77) All-NFC in 1975 and second Team All-NFC in 1978.  In addition, Pearson was a Pro Bowler in 1974, 1976 and 1977. He was named The Football Digest NFL receiver of the year in 1977. He led the National Football Conference (NFC) in pass receptions in 1976 with 58.  He served as offensive captain for the Cowboys in 1977, 1978, 1982 and 1983.

In 1984, he was named to the Dallas Cowboys' 25th anniversary team.

In 2009, on the NFL Network show "NFL's Top 10", in the episode titled "Greatest Dallas Cowboys", he is number 10 on the list, although the update in 2016 where Drew was not on the list and was replaced by Randy White as #10 as well.

On August 19, 2011, Cowboys owner Jerry Jones announced that Pearson had been selected for inclusion into the Dallas Cowboys Ring of Honor. Pearson, Charles Haley and Larry Allen were inducted during the half-time show of the Cowboys-Seahawks game on November 6, 2011.

The Professional Football Researchers Association named Pearson to the PFRA Hall of Very Good Class of 2010.

Pearson was named as a senior finalist for the Pro Football Hall of Fame in the Class of 2020 as a part of its "Centenial Slate" of 20 senior finalists. However, he fell just shy of getting inducted. The following year, he was named the lone senior finalist for the class of 2021.

On February 6, 2021, Pearson was named to the 2021 Pro Football Hall of Fame class and his bust was sculpted by Scott Myers.

After the NFL
On April 28, 2017, Pearson was selected to announce a pick at the 2017 NFL Draft, which took place at Philadelphia. Amidst boos from the Eagles fans in attendance, he made a dramatic speech, and announced Chidobe Awuzie as the 60th pick for the Cowboys.

References

External links
 
 Drew Pearson Cowboys Ring of Honor
 Dallas Cowboys Top 50 players

1951 births
Living people
People from South River, New Jersey
Players of American football from New Jersey
South River High School (New Jersey) alumni[
Sportspeople from Middlesex County, New Jersey
African-American players of American football
American football quarterbacks
American football wide receivers
Tulsa Golden Hurricane football players
Dallas Cowboys players
Dallas Texans (Arena) coaches
Dallas Cowboys coaches
National Conference Pro Bowl players
African-American coaches of American football
National Football League announcers
21st-century African-American people
20th-century African-American sportspeople